Solomon Abera Gebremichae (1968–2011) was a press freedom advocate, and detractor of the Afewerki government. He died of cancer in December 2011.

Life in Eritrea
Before becoming a journalist Abera was a textile worker. Following the Eritrean War of Independence in 1991 he worked for the Ministry of Information in the new Eritrean government. On September 18, 2001, Abera was the news presenter on state-controlled television that announced the end of Eritrea's independent press and the rounding up of leading independent newspaper editors and ruling-party dissidents. In response to mounting government intimidation and censorship Abera fled Eritrea in 2005.

Exile
Following his departure from Eritrea he became an active critic of the Afewerki government on numerous diaspora websites and an advocate for press freedom. In 2009 he began working with Free Press Unlimited providing several trainings and field missions. In 2011 Abera was among a group of exiled Eritrean journalists who met Prime Minister Meles Zenawi of Ethiopia.

Criticism 
Abera's detractors have accused him of being an informant and collaborator with the Ethiopian government, and the Derg regime in particular, during the Eritrean War of Independence.

References

1968 births
2011 deaths
Eritrean journalists
Textile workers
Deaths from cancer in Germany
Male journalists